Micropruina glycogenica is a Gram-positive and non-spore-forming bacterium which has been isolated from activated sludge in Japan.

References 

Propionibacteriales
Bacteria described in 2000
Monotypic bacteria genera